Jerzy Marian Materna (born 25 March 1956 in Zielona Góra) is a Polish politician. He was elected to the Sejm on 25 September 2005, getting 5,371 votes in 8 Zielona Góra district as a candidating from the Law and Justice list.

See also
Members of Polish Sejm 2005-2007

External links
Jerzy Materna - parliamentary page - includes declarations of interest, voting record, and transcripts of speeches.

1956 births
Living people
People from Zielona Góra
Law and Justice politicians
Members of the Polish Sejm 2005–2007
Members of the Polish Sejm 2007–2011
Members of the Polish Sejm 2011–2015
Members of the Polish Sejm 2015–2019
Members of the Polish Sejm 2019–2023